Damian Whitewood is an Australian dancer and former dancesport competitor.

Background

Born and raised in Perth, Western Australia Damian was first introduced to ballroom dancing at the age of 10 through his older brother. His mother was also a competitive ballroom dancer in her childhood days in London.

From the age of 14, Damian was traveling across Australia competing in both ballroom and Latin competitions. He became National state champion, Australian champion, and Australasian champion in both ballroom and Latin and represented Australia in many world competitions.

Career
In 2001 he joined the cast of Burn the Floor, which has sold millions of tickets in over 30 countries and 160 cities worldwide. He was a dancer with the company in 2009 making his Broadway debut. In 2010, Damian made the move to prime-time television in the US as one of the professional dancers on ABC’s top rated program, "Dancing With The Stars" on season 10. He was partnered with Pamela Anderson who he has continually been working with all around the world. Damian has guest appeared on the Israeli "Rokdim Im Kokhavim" רוקדים עם כוכבים, version of "Dancing With The Stars". He has also competed on the Argentine "Bailando por un Sueño" Series 7. Damian has choreographed and appeared on "So You Think You Can Dance" in Australia and the Netherlands and also "La Academia" in Mexico. He was a Co-Host at the Just For Laughs comedy festival in Montreal, Quebec, Canada for Pamela Anderson's Variety Gala.
Damian was a runner-up on the Australian "Dancing With The Stars" Season 12 with Danielle Spencer.

Controversy
In October 2012, Whitewood's former dancing partner on Australia's Dancing with the Stars, Danielle Spencer, separated from her husband Russell Crowe. In the weeks prior to the separation Spencer and Whitewood had been seen out together.

References

Living people
Australian ballroom dancers
Participants in American reality television series
Year of birth missing (living people)